Technopolis (Spanish Tecnópolis) is a science, technology, industry and art mega exhibition in Argentina. It is the largest of its kind in the country. Located in Villa Martelli, in the Vicente Lopez division, Tecnopolis was inaugurated on July 14, 2011, by President Cristina Fernández de Kirchner.

History 

Initially, Technopolis was scheduled to be held in Buenos Aires after the Argentina Bicentennial celebrations.

The mega exhibition was planned to be the end of the Bicentennial celebrations organized by the national government in 2010, and inaugurated on November 19, 2010 in Buenos Aires for the "Day of Sovereignty", the anniversary of the Battle of Vuelta de Obligado, in the area of parks of the Avenida Figueroa Alcorta. However, in October 2010, the Chief of Government of Buenos Aires, Mauricio Macri, denied authorization in such plots as the transport system would collapse in the city.

Thus, the national government decided to relocate the mega exhibition in an area of fifty hectares in the Province of Buenos Aires, located in Villa Martelli, Vicente López, at the former barracks of Army Battalion 601.

Continents (2011 edition) 

The exhibition has over 100 stands that are organized in five continents: Water, Earth, Air, Fire and Imagination. These take the visitors to different aspects and practices of the past, present and future Argentinean scientist. To make this historical review educational, there is a timeline with milestones expressed in posters of local achievements in the world of science.

The exhibit also features discussions and scientific presentations to the public in general, some of the scientists involved are Vicente Barros, Nora Sabelli, Gonzalo Zabala, Alberto Saal, Sebastian Kadena, Roberto Etchenique, Lino Barañao, Ariel Arbiser, among others.

One mile of track was installed on the property, providing access to a train that runs the exhibition from one extreme to another. The rolling stock in use on the line is a railbus manufactured by the Argentine company TecnoTren. It has the same body of a bus, is lightweight, requires special way, and uses an automatic gearbox and diesel engine. Currently, this model is used in various parts of the country as a regular service.

Arena 

Tecnópolis hosts an indoor multipurpose venue for 12,000 people that has been used mostly for concerts and sport events. Some of the artists that have performed in this venue are Blur, Lana Del Rey, Beck, Travis, Imagine Dragons, Juana Molina, Attaque 77, Evanescence and Catupecu Machu. Soy Luna, It has also hosted the 2015 Davis Cup World Group quarterfinal between Argentina and Serbia, the 2016 Pan American Men's Handball Championship, the opening ceremony of the 2013 Youth Parapan American Games and the futsal competitions at the 2018 Summer Youth Olympics.

Events
It was one of the main venues of the 2018 Summer Youth Olympics and will be the site for the 2023 world's fair.

Gallery

References

External links 

 Official Website

Argentine culture
Argentine art
2011 establishments in Argentina
Presidency of Cristina Fernández de Kirchner
World's fair sites in South America
Venues of the 2018 Summer Youth Olympics
Youth Olympic futsal venues